En=Trance is the twentieth studio album by electronic artist Klaus Schulze. It was originally released in 1988, and in 2005 was his seventh album reissued by Revisited Records. In 2017 it was reissued again in a newly remastered version.

Track listing
All tracks composed by Klaus Schulze.

References

External links
 En=Trance at the official site of Klaus Schulze
 

Klaus Schulze albums
1988 albums